Colonel Martin Graham Clive Amlôt,  (born 1947) is a retired British Army officer, former High Sheriff of Merseyside and former Deputy Lieutenant of Merseyside.

Military Career and Later Appointments
Amlôt attended the Royal Military Academy Sandhurst, before commissioning into the King's Regiment on 15 December 1967. He was promoted to Lieutenant on 15 June 1969, Captain on 15 December 1973, and Major on 30 September 1980. During his time in the King's Regiment, and then as a staff officer, Amlôt served in the Caribbean, Germany, Canada, Norway, Hong Kong, the Falkland Islands, Kenya, Northern Ireland, and the United States. As a major, he became the second-in-command of 1st Battalion, King's Regiment; before being promoted to Lieutenant Colonel on 30 June 1990, and taking command of the 5th/8th Battalion, King's Regiment. He finally served as Secretary to the Commanders in Chiefs' Committee (Germany), before retiring from the army on 1 November 1994.

Once retired, Amlôt became the Regimental Secretary of the King's Regiment, seeing him run the home headquarters of the regiment. When the regiment amalgamated with two others to become the Duke of Lancaster's Regiment in 2006, he was appointed Regimental Secretary once more of the new regiment, and continued in that capacity until 2011. Amlôt joined Merseyside Army Cadet Force in 1994, as a Colonel and the Commandant of the county.  He completed the appointment and left in 1999.

Voluntary Appointments
He was appointed as the High Sheriff of Merseyside for 2012–2013,  and served as a  Deputy Lieutenant of Merseyside from November 2000 to June 2022.

Amlôt also serves as a Patron of Sefton Council for Voluntary Services and as the Chairman of the Board of Rushton Futures at the Royal School for the Blind, Liverpool.  He is a member of the Foundation of Liverpool College.  He was the 2020-21 President of the Liverpool Athenaeum.  He is the 2022-24 President of the Liverpool Geological Society, the Treasurer of the Arts Society Wirral and is also the current President of St John Ambulance in Merseyside.

Awards
Amlôt was appointed an OBE in the 1993 Queen's Birthday Honours. In 2008, he was appointed a Serving Brother of the Order of St John, received an Order service medal in 2011, and was appointed an Officer of the Order in 2013.

Personal life
in 1971 he married Jacqueline Pyett of Bridport in Dorset.  They had two sons.  He was widowed in 1987 and married again.  His wife, Daphne Amlôt,  (Nee Frost) was born in Southsea, Hampshire.

References

Living people
King's Regiment officers
Officers of the Order of the British Empire
Officers of the Order of St John
1947 births
Deputy Lieutenants of Merseyside